PAYOMATIC is a consumer financial services retailer with 148 stores located throughout the New York metropolitan area. The company was founded in 1958 and today is New York’s largest provider of check cashing and financial services, handling nearly 20 million transactions annually.

PAYOMATIC provides check cashing services, money transfers, money orders, bill payments, prepaid debit cards and a variety of other convenience services. The company is headquartered in Syosset, NY.

History 
The Pay-O-Matic Corporation was founded in 1958, and was originally known as Paymaster Corporation. The name was changed to Pay-O-Matic in 1970.

In 2008, New York-based private equity firm Founders Equity Inc. acquired the outstanding shares of the Pay-O-Matic Corporation, and all assets of C.L.B. Check Cashing Inc., through an investment vehicle, FEF Cash Inc. The Pay-O-Matic and C.L.B. businesses were combined and operated under the Pay-O-Matic name, creating the leading check-cashing and related financial services company in the state of New York.

PAYOMATIC also owns and operates Rapid Armored Corporation, an armored car carrier subsidiary which has served banks, retailers, ATM networks and large businesses for more than 45 years. 
 
PAYOMATIC is a member of Financial Service Centers of New York, the professional trade association representing New York’s licensed check cashing industry.

References 

Financial services companies of the United States
Financial services companies based in New York (state)
Companies based in New York (state)
Companies based in Nassau County, New York
Financial services companies established in 1958
1958 establishments in New York (state)